Demi Lovato: Live in Concert (also known as the Summer Tour 2009) was the first headlining concert tour by American singer Demi Lovato, in support of her first two studio albums Don't Forget (2008) and Here We Go Again (2009).

Background
The national tour began as the Summer Tour, on June 21, 2009, and ended August 21, 2009, covering a total of 40 cities. David Archuleta served as the special guest for the entire tour except for some tour dates at state fairs when David had concerts outside of this tour. David also scheduled solo shows on dates that were canceled such as Louisville and Grand Rapids. Opening acts KSM and Jordan Pruitt also appeared on select dates.

On this tour, Lovato promoted her second album, Here We Go Again. The last three dates of the tour were rescheduled due to filming Camp Rock 2: The Final Jam and eventually took place in fall 2009. This tour won Choice Summer Tour at the 2009 Teen Choice Awards, shared with David Archuleta.

The tour further ventured into South America. In Brazil, tickets went on sale on March 30, 2010, for members of the official fanclub, and then to the general public on April 1, 2010. According to information given by Via Funchal's ticket office, all tickets to the concert were already sold by May 5, 2010, for about 6,100 people, but for safety reasons the number was dropped to 5,285, and in the end all of them were sold out again. In the HSBC Arena in Rio de Janeiro over half the tickets to the concert were already sold or reserved by April 10, about 2,400 people, for a concert of 4,700. In the end, all tickets were sold except for a very few. In Colombia, tickets began selling on April 9, 2010, where 81% of the tickets were sold, and Chile followed on April 12, 2010. However, in Chile, tickets were almost completely sold out as only two tickets were available in the end (100%).

Opening acts
David Archuleta
KSM
Jordan Pruitt

Setlists

Tour dates

References 

2009 concert tours
2010 concert tours
Demi Lovato concert tours